Chehel Tokhm (also known as Chahil Turkm, Chehel Tokhm-e Bam, and Chehil Tukhm) is a village in Posht Rud Rural District, in the Central District of Narmashir County, Kerman Province, Iran. At the 2006 census, its population was 705, in 181 families.

References 

Populated places in Narmashir County